Eden Vale is a small village in County Durham, in England.  It is a few miles to the south of Peterlee.

References

Villages in County Durham
Castle Eden